Faith Lutheran Church, formerly known as Salem Lutheran Church, is a historic church at 199 Granite Street in Quincy, Massachusetts.  The church was built in 1894 to serve a growing congregation of Scandinavians who had come to Quincy to work in its granite quarries.  The stones for this granite Gothic Revival church building were hauled and dressed by members of the congregation.  Its only major modification since its construction has been the addition of a chapel in 1914.

The building was listed on the National Register of Historic Places in 1989.

See also
National Register of Historic Places listings in Quincy, Massachusetts

References

External links
Faith Lutheran Church

Lutheran churches in Massachusetts
Churches on the National Register of Historic Places in Massachusetts
Gothic Revival church buildings in Massachusetts
Churches completed in 1892
19th-century Lutheran churches in the United States
Churches in Quincy, Massachusetts
Stone churches in Massachusetts
National Register of Historic Places in Quincy, Massachusetts
Granite buildings